Obshoron (Russian and Tajik: Обшорон, formerly: Quruqsoy) is a town in north-western Tajikistan. It is located in Mastchoh District, Sughd Region.

Notes

References

External links
Satellite map at Maplandia.com

Populated places in Sughd Region